Visitors is an original novel based on the U.S. television series Buffy the Vampire Slayer. Tagline: "The slayer is being stalked".

Plot summary
Buffy notices that, while patrolling,  she's being stalked by a demon that emits a high pitched giggle. After discussion and research with Giles, they discover that Buffy's being stalked by a 'Korred'; a nasty hairy beast that feeds on peoples life forces by making them dance to his magical song until they die. The Korred is particularly attracted to Buffy because of her Slayer aura. Buffy must stop the Korred before he makes her dance to her death.

Continuity
Supposed to be set late in Buffy season 3.
Ethan Rayne appears in this story, presumably after his appearance in season three's "Band Candy."
Buffyverse canon characters include: Buffy, Xander, Willow, Giles, Angel, Cordelia, Oz, Joyce, Ethan Rayne, Devon, Jonathan, Principal Snyder 
Buffyverse non-canon characters include: Gerald Panner (Watcher); Sheila, C.B., Rebecca, Elaine, Miriam (student teachers)
 The concept of a demon making Buffy dance to death is used later on by the demon Sweet in the season six musical episode "Once More, with Feeling".

Canonical issues

Buffy novels such as this one are not usually considered by fans as canonical. Some fans consider them stories from the imaginations of authors and artists, while other fans consider them as taking place in an alternative fictional reality. However unlike fan fiction, overviews summarising their story, written early in the writing process, were 'approved' by both Fox and Joss Whedon (or his office), and the books were therefore later published as officially Buffy merchandise.

External links
 Interview with Laura Anne Gilman and Josepha Sherman at Watcher's Web. Includes questions/answers about Visitors.

Reviews
Litefoot1969.bravepages.com – Review of this book by Litefoot
Teen-books.com – Reviews of this book
Nika-summers.com – Review of this book by Nika Summers
Shadowcat.name – Review of this book

1999 American novels
1999 fantasy novels
Books based on Buffy the Vampire Slayer